Nona Gabrielyan (born on January 27, 1944, in Tbilisi) is an Armenian artist, sculptor.

Career 
Nona Gabrielyan was born in 1944 in Tbilisi, Georgia. In 1968 Gabrielyan graduated from Fine Arts and Drama Institute of Yerevan. Since
1971 she is a member of Artists' Union of Armenia and a member of Artist’s Union of the ASSR, 1999 a member of the International Academy of Pottery KERAMOS in Warsaw. Since 1995 Gabielyan gives Master classes (painting and graphics) at Art Atelier N&V in Wiesbaden, Germany. Since 2004 she is a  lecturer at Teacher at National High School VHS, Culture and Creativity, Wiesbaden, Germany

Exhibitions

Solo exhibitions
 2016 "Between Heaven and Earth", Museum of Modern Art, Yerevan, Armenia
 2015  Art from Eastern Europe, Wallau, Germany
 2013 "Eastern European painting", Main-Taunus-Gallery, Hochheim, Germany
 2012 "World in Colors", Kurhaus Christian-Zais Hall, Wiesbaden Germany
 2011 Hofheim Town Hall, Chinonplatz, Wallauer Fachwerk Kulturkreis, Germany
 2011, 2005, 1996, 1998      Kurhaus, Christian-Tsays-Hall, Wiesbaden, Germany
 2009 "The Road to Light", Christian-Tsays-Hall, Wiesbaden, Germany
 2008  National Gallery of Armenia, Yerevan
 2006  "Painting Graphics" Haus der Heimat, Wiesbaden, Germany
 2003  "The colour of the form" The City Gallery of Bergheim, Germany
 2002 The City Gallery "Salz Tour", "Easel Pottery" Halle Germany
 2001  Kurhaus, Colonnade, Wiesbaden, Germany
 2000  "Modern Art of Armenia", Old City Hall, Fürstenwalde, Germany
 1999  Gallery Art Present, Paris, France
 1999  Cité internationale des arts, Paris, France
 1998  "Route" Municipal Gallery, Walluf, Germany
 1997  GRS-center, Köln, Germany
 1997  City Gallery, Bergheim, Germany
 1995 "Ceramic plastic from Armenia", City Gallery, Halle-Saale, Germany
 1994  "Plastic - Painting - Graphics" Museum of Ceramics, Frechen, Germany
 1993  Plastic - Painting – Graphics, Museum of Ceramics, Frechen, Germany
 1992 Editorial board of "Arvest" magazine, Yerevan, Armenia
 1986 "Masters of Fine Arts of Armenia" Permanent Mission of the Armenian SSR, Moscow
 1980 The Museum of Modern Art, Yerevan, Armenia

Symposiums 
 1974, 1976, 1983 International Symposium of Ceramics, House of Creativity of Artists Dzintari, Latvia

Group exhibitions 
 2004, 2007  "1+14" Haus der Heimat, Wiesbaden Germany
 1999, 1994  MIASTO IV, II International Ceramic Biennial "KERAMOS" International Ceramics, Design Center Warsaw, Poland
 1995 "Plastic" Kreishaus, Bergheim Germany
 1993 "Painting and Graphics" Goethe Institute, Frankfurt, Germany
 1992 "Color of Armenia", Haus der Heimat, Wiesbaden, Germany
 1987 "Art of Armenia" Prague, Czech, Warsaw  Poland, Budapest, Hungary
 1986 "Armenian Art", Leningrad Academy of Arts, USSR
 1985 Soviet Decorative Art, Berlin, Germany
 1984 Modern Ceramics of the USSR, Hohr-Grenzhausen, Germany
 1983, 1973 "Armenian Art", Artists‘ Union, the USSR, Moscow
 1982 40Della CERAMICA D’ARTE Ceramics International Competition in Faenza, Italy
 1980 International Biennale De Ceramique D’ART Ceramics International Competition, Vallauris, France, Diploma
 1980 38 Della CERAMICA D'ARTE International Ceramics Competition, Faenza, Italy
 1978 International Biennale de Céramique d'Art, international ceramics competition Vallauris, France
 1971 "Armenian Art", Montreal, Canada
 1968 The exhibition of the best diploma theses, Leningrad Academy of Arts, the USSR (today the Academy of Arts of St. Petersburg, Russia

Collections
 Museum of Modern Art Yerevan, Armenia
 National Gallery of Armenia, Yerevan
 State Museum of Oriental Art, Moscow, Russia
 Ethnography Museum in Sardarapat, Armenia
 "Keramion" Frechen, Deutschland

Catalogues
 1983 Nona Gabrielyan’s ceramics
 2007 Album "Plastics, Art, Poetry"

Literary works
 2003 The collection of poems "Fossils of Heavens" (in Russian).
 2005 Collection of poems "The Touch" (Russian)
 2006 Russian-German collection of poems "Ins Nirgendwo" (From Nowhere)
 2011 Russian-Armenian collection of poems "Color of the Word"
 2013 Essay "Tender Clouds of Sadness" (Russian).
 2017 Fictional and non-fictional stories "The Magic of Solitude" (Russian).

Family
 Husband - Van Soghomonyan, artist
 Daughter - Lilit Soghomonyan, painter
 Grandson - Guy Ghazanchyan, painter, sculptor

Gallery
Paintings

Sculptures

References

External links

1944 births
Living people
20th-century Armenian women artists
21st-century women artists
Armenian sculptors
Armenian women sculptors
Artists from Tbilisi
20th-century sculptors
21st-century sculptors
Armenian painters
Armenian women painters
20th-century painters
21st-century Armenian painters